Loerrach International e.V. (registered association) is an association of citizens, educational, sport and cultural institutions, service clubs, municipal administration and local council in Lörrach in southwestern Germany. It has the goal of fostering relations with the town's partner towns. Its structure has long been a model for similar town partnership organisations in other European cities.

Foundation and function
At the suggestion of Charles de Gaulle and Konrad Adenauer, the then mayor of Loerrach Egon Hugenschmidt founded the first partnership with Sens in France in 1966. Under mayor Rainer Offergeld the partnership with Senigallia in Italy followed and in 1986 and under mayor Gudrun Heute-Bluhm in 2003 with Chester in England. Further partnerships have been established with Meerane in Saxony, Vyshhorod in the Ukraine und Lubliniec in Silesia. A special feature is the friendship with Edirne in Turkey, which arose from a citizens‘ initiative.

Loerrach International was founded by Gudrun Heute-Bluhm as president and Manfred G. Raupp as chairman on 22 September 2004. The various fractions in the city council were each asked to nominate a representative and a deputy to the extended board of the society.

Working groups 

Working groups were set up for Sens, Senigallia, Chester, Meerane, and Eastern Europe, and the youth organisation SAK Lörrach, the town band, its schools (Hans-Thoma-Gymnasium Lörrach, Phaenovum Schülerforschungszentrum Lörrach-Dreiländereck) and DHBW-Loerrach, sport and culture organisations and service clubs were invited to collaborate.
On his election to mayor in 2014 Jörg Lutz became ex officio president of the society.

Since the society's foundation around 50 events involving the partner towns have taken place every year, the majority involving schools and youth groups from the partner towns.

Structure 
The structure of the society brings together interested citizens, educational institutions, the local council and city administration. The president is ex officio the current mayor and the secretarial duties of the management committee is the responsibility of the representatives of the various town partnerships. However, all other activities are conducted by about 140 members on a voluntary basis.

Since November 2022 Prof. Dr. Sebastian Feichtmair, Head of International Business at Baden-Wuerttemberg Cooperative State University Loerrach, has been the chairperson. He took over from Susanne Daniel who became the 2nd chairperson.

Honorary members 
 Derek Jackson, KBE Chester, Chester International Link Assoziation
 Gudrun Heute-Bluhm, Loerrach, former President of Loerrach International
 Manfred G. Raupp, Stutensee, former Chairman of Loerrach International

External links 
 Web Pages Loerrach-International
 Activities (in German)

Literature 
 Manfred G. Raupp & Baerbel Bouziane: Loerrach und die Elysee Freundschaft, Loerrach 2013 
 Manfred G. Raupp & Peter Lepkojis: Das deutsch-türkische Pflegeprojekt Lörrach-Edirne; Eine Information für den deutsch-türkischen Pflegekräfteaustausch, Lörrach 2013 
Manfred G. Raupp: DHBW Cooperative State University; an innovative system of higher education; Balkan Conference Edirne 2010
Manfred G. Raupp: Lörrach Symposium; 5 Jahre Hochschul- und Kulturpartnerschaft Lörrach-Edirne, Lörrach 2011 
 Manfred G. Raupp: Enver Duran; Medizinprofessor und Rektor der Trakya Universität 2004–2012, Lörrach 2012

Presentations 
 Manfred G. Raupp: Die DHBW-Lörrach bietet ein innovatives Studiensystem; Balkankonferenz Edirne Mai 2010
 Bernd Martin: Lörrach-Tag Trakaya-Universität Edirne DHBW Lörrach und ihre Bedeutung für die Region
 Enver Duran: Die Entwicklung der Universitäten in der Türkei und Deutschland und deren aktuelle Chancen und Probleme; Lörrach Symposium Edirne Mai 2011
 Mukadder Seyhan Yücel: Der Stellenwert der Fremdsprachen an der Trakya Universität; Lörrach Symposium Edirne Mai 2011
 Hilmi Ibar: Die Trakya Universität und deren Engagement im Netzwerk der Balkanuniversitäten
 Manfred G. Raupp: Würdigung anlässlich der Verabschiedung von Enver Duran, Medizinprofessor und Rektor der Trakya Universität Edirne 2004–2012, Brückenbauer und Friedensstifter.

References

Municipal international relations
International relations